Gymnoscelis inexpressa is a moth in the family Geometridae. It was described by Louis Beethoven Prout in 1923. It is endemic to India.

References

Moths described in 1923
inexpressa